is a Japanese film director best known for his work on various anime works. A leading director at the Toei Animation studio during the 1960s, 1970s, and 1980s, Katsumata worked as a director on several of Toei's anime television adaptations of manga by Go Nagai, including Devilman (1972), Mazinger Z (1972), Cutey Honey (1973), Great Mazinger (1974), UFO Robo Grendizer (1975) and Gaiking (1976) (both Grendizer and Gaiking became later part of Jim Terry's Force Five package on U.S. television). Katsumata also directed a TV adaptation of Silver Fang -The Shooting Star Gin- in 1986.

Katsumata graduated from Nippon University's film school in 1960 and began working with the Kyoto division of the Toei Company that same year as an assistant director to Masahiro Makino, Eiichi Kudo, Tomotaka Tasaka on his samurai dramas. After a few years, Katsumata moved to Toei Doga (Toei Animation) in Tokyo, working as a director on some of Toei's early television series, including Ken the Wolf Boy (1963), the original Cyborg 009 anime (1968) and Tiger Mask (1970).

Among Katsumata's other credits for Toei as a director include the TV series Captain Future (1978), Fist of the North Star (1984) and OVA series Saint Seiya: Hades (2005, episodes 14 to 31), and the feature films Mazinger Z vs. Devilman (1973), The Little Mermaid (Anderusen Douwa Ningyo Hime, 1975), and Arcadia of My Youth (1982). Katsumata also directed New Attacker You (続・アタッカーYOU　金メダルへの道 Zoku atakkā YOU- kin medaru e no michi?) for Knack Productions in 2008.

External links
 
 

1938 births
Japanese film directors
Anime directors
Living people
Nihon University alumni